Niete (Niété in French) is a town in the Océan Department, South Province of Cameroon.

See also
Communes of Cameroon

Populated places in South Region (Cameroon)